Georges Devilly was a French racing cyclist. He finished in last place in the 1909 Tour de France. In November 1919 he participated in and finished the Grand Prix de l'Armistice. A month later he contracted the Spanish flu of which he died on 2 January 1920.

References

External links
 

Year of birth missing
1920 deaths
French male cyclists
Place of birth missing
Deaths from the Spanish flu pandemic in France